Malmö Arab Film Festival (MAFF) is an Arab film festival based in Malmö, Sweden. MAFF is widely regarded as the most influential and largest Arabic film festival in Europe, and is the only one in Scandinavia. The first edition was held in 2011 and today the festival presents a broad selection of films made by Arab filmmakers or that in some way connects with questions of the Arab world or culture.

Winners

Best Film
2011:  Messages from the Sea, directed by Daoud Abdel Sayed (Egypt)
2012: Cairo Exit, directed by Hesham Issawi (Egypt)
2013: Blind Intersections, directed by Lara Saba (Lebanon)
2014: Adiós Carmen, directred by Mohamed Amin Benamraoui (Morocco)
2015: Theeb, directed by Naji Abu Nowar (Jordan)
2016: 3000 Nights, directed by Mai Masri (Palestine)
2017: Ali, the Goat and Ibrahim, directed by Sherif El Bendary (Egypt)
2018: Wajib, directed by Annemarie Jacir (Palestine)
2019: Exterior/Night, directed by Ahmad Abdalla (Egypt)
2020: A Son, directed by Mehdi Barsaoui (Tunisia)
2021: The Man Who Sold His Skin, directed by Kaouther Ben Hania (Tunisia, France)

Best Director
2013: Maggie Morgan for Asham: a man called Hope (Egypt)
2014: Hany Abu-Assad for Omar (Palestine)
2015: Amin Dora for Ghadi (Lebanon)
2016: Lotfi Bouchouchi for The Well (Algeria)
2017: Lotfi Achour for Burning Hope (Tunisia)
2018: Mohamed Al-Daradji for The Journey (Iraq)
2019: Bahij Hojeij for Good Morning (Lebanon)
2020: Amjad Abu Alala for You Will Die at Twenty (Sudan)
2021: Abdulaziz Alshlahei for The Tambour of Retribution (Saudi Arabia)

Best Actor
2011: Asser Yassin for Messages from the Sea 
2012: Amine Ennaji for The Forgotten (Les oubliés de l'Histoire)
2013: Basse Samra for After the Battle
2014: Adam Bakri for Omar
2015: Nour El Sherif for Cairo Time 
2016: Ashraf Barhom for The Curve (Al Munataf)
2017: Azelarab Kaghat for Hayat 
2018: Ali Yahyaoui for Benzine
2019: Ahmed Hafiane for Fatwa
2020: Mohamed Hatem for When We're Born
2021: Salim Dau for Gaza mon amour

Best Actress
2011: Julia Kassar for Here Comes The Rain 
2012: Nelly Karim for Cairo 678 (Les Femmes du bus 678)
2013: Waad Mohammed for Wadjda
2014: Yasmin Raeis for Factory Girl
2015: Malak Ermileh for Eyes of a Thief
2016: Menna Shalabi for Nawara
2017: Anissa Daoud for Burning Hope (Demain dès l’aube)
2018: Zahraa Ghandour for The Journey
2019: Fatima Attif for The Healer (La Guérisseuse)
2020: Najla Ben Abdallah for A Son
2021: Naima Lemcherki for Autumn of Apple Trees (L'Automne des Pommiers)

References

External links
 Malmö Arab Film Festival (MAFF) - Official homepage

Film festivals in Sweden
Malmö